Carles Lerín (born 1 April 1962) is a Spanish modern pentathlete. He competed at the 1992 Summer Olympics.

References

1962 births
Living people
Spanish male modern pentathletes
Olympic modern pentathletes of Spain
Modern pentathletes at the 1992 Summer Olympics
Sportspeople from Bern